Archbold Criminal Pleading, Evidence and Practice (usually called simply Archbold) is the leading practitioners' text for criminal lawyers in England and Wales and several other common law jurisdictions around the world.

It has been in publication since 1822, when it was first written by John Frederick Archbold, and is currently published by Sweet & Maxwell, a subsidiary of Thomson Reuters. Forty-three revisions were published prior to 1992 and since then it has been published annually. Its authority is such that it is often quoted in court.

The team of authors is made up of experienced barristers, KCs and judges.

Editors

Magistrates' courts
As far as it covers procedure and practice, Archbold refers to those of the Crown Court. A separate volume, Archbold Magistrates' Courts Criminal Practice covers the magistrates' courts.  Archbold Magistrates' Courts Criminal Practice is now in its 19th edition.

References

External links
The 1st edition of this book (1822), from Google Books .
The 1st American edition of this book (1824), from Google Books .
The 4th edition of this book (1831), from Google Books 
The 5th American edition of this book (1846), from Google Books 
The 12th edition of this book, republished (with accretions and along with another book by Archbold) in Waterman's Archbold (1853), volume 1  and volume 2 , from Google Books.
The 23rd edition of this book from Internet Archive. 

Legal treatises
1822 non-fiction books